Carroll John Daly (1889–1958) was a writer of crime fiction.

Early life
Daly was born on September 14, 1889, in Yonkers, New York.

Career
Daly has been credited with creating the first hard-boiled story, "The False Burton Combs", published in Black Mask magazine in December 1922, followed closely by "It's All in the Game" (Black Mask, April 1923) and the PI story "Three Gun Terry" (Black Mask, May 1923). Daly's private detective Race Williams first appeared in "Knights of the Open Palm", an anti-Ku Klux Klan story. "Knights of the Open Palm" was published June 1, 1923, in Black Mask, predating the October 1923 debut of Dashiell Hammett's Continental Op character. Although Black Mask editor George Sutton did not like the Race Williams stories, they were so popular with readers that he asked Daly to continue writing them. Daly's Williams was a rough-and-ready character with a sharp tongue and established the model for many later acerbic private eyes.

Daly also created other pulp detectives, including Detective Satan Hall, "Three-Gun Terry" Mack, and Vee Brown. During the 1920s and 1930s, Daly was considered the leader of the naturalistic school of crime writers. Daly was a hugely popular author: his name on a pulp magazine cover meant an increase in sales. A Black Mask readers' poll once showed Daly as the most popular writer in the magazine, ahead of Hammett and Erle Stanley Gardner. In addition to Black Mask, Daly also wrote for other pulp magazines, including Detective Fiction Weekly and Dime Detective. After leaving Black Mask, Daly found other magazines did not want serials. Daly’s solution was the ‘story arc’, stand alone stories that did not depend on each other, yet tied together to make a larger theme/plot.

In the 1940s, Daly's work fell out of fashion with crime fiction readers, and he moved to California to work on comics and film scripts.  When Mickey Spillane became a bestselling novelist with Mike Hammer, a character similar to Daly's detectives, Daly remarked "I'm broke, and this guy gets rich writing about my detective." However, Spillane wrote Daly a fan letter saying that Race Williams was the model for his own Mike Hammer. The story goes (at least as far as Spillane told it) that when Daly’s agent at the time saw the letter, she instituted a plagiarism suit. Whereupon Daly canned her because he hadn’t gotten a fan letter in years and he sure as hell wasn’t about to sue anybody who had actually taken the time to write one.

He died on January 16, 1958, in Los Angeles, California.

Novels
The White Circle (1926) 
The Snarl of the Beast (1927)
Man in the Shadows (1928)
The Hidden Hand (1929)
The Tag Murders (1930) 
Tainted Power (1931) 
The Third Murderer (1931) 
The Amateur Murderer (1933) 
Murder Won’t Wait (1933) 
Murder from the East (1935)
Mr. Strang (1936) 
The Mystery of the Smoking Gun (1936) 
The Emperor of Evil (1937) 
Better Corpses (1940)
Murder at Our House (1950)
Ready to Burn (1951)

Precursor to Race Williams
"The False Burton Combs", Black Mask, December 1922, in Herbert Ruhm (1977), ed., The Hard-boiled Detective:  Stories from "Black Mask" Magazine (1920-1951), New York:  Vintage.

Race Williams Stories

All published in Black Mask magazine, thru ‘The Eyes Have It’ (Nov 1934) The Altus Press aka Steeger Books has re-published all the Black Mask stories in a six-volume set. There is a plan to publish the complete stories; info at steegerbooks.com.

Knights of the Open Palm (June 1923) Race vs. The KKK. Appeared in special KKK number of Black Mask Vol.6 No. 5 June 1, 1923

Three Thousand to the Good (July 1923)

The Red Peril (June 1924)

Them That Lives by Their Guns (August 1924)

Devil Cat (November 1924)

The Face Behind the Mask (February 1925)

Conceited, Maybe (April 1925)

Say It with Lead (June 1925)

I'll Tell the World (August 1925)

Alias, Buttercup (October 1925)

novel: Under Cover [parts:1-2] (December 1925 - January 1926)

South Sea Steel (May 1926)

The False Clara Burkhart (July 1926)

The Super Devil (August 1926)

Half-Breed (November 1926)

Blind Alleys (April 1927)

novel: The Snarl of the Beast [parts: 1-4] (June, July, August, September 1927) [*book - 1927]

The Egyptian Lure (March 1928)

novel: The Hidden Hand [Creeping Death] (June 1928); The Hidden Hand - Wanted For Murder (July 1928); The Hidden Hand - Rough Stuff (August 1928); The Hidden Hand - The Last Chance (September 1928); The Hidden Hand - The Last Shot (October 1928). [*book - 1929]
novel: Tags of Death (March 1929); A Pretty Bit of Shooting (April 1929); Get Race Williams (May 1929); Race Williams Never Bluffs (June 1929) [aka: The Tag Murders *book - 1930] Race Williams (& Flame)
novel: The Silver Eagle (October- November 1929); [*? title of 2nd part: "The Death Trap" (November 1929). Serial dropped after Part 2] Race Williams (& Flame)
novel: Tainted Power (June 1930); Framed (July 1930); The Final Shot (August 1930) [aka: Tainted Power *book - 1931] Race Williams (& Flame)

Shooting Out of Turn (October 1930)

Murder by Mail (March 1931)

novel: The Flame and Race Williams [parts:1-3] (June, July, August 1931) [aka: The Third Murderer *book - 1931] Race Williams (& Flame)

Death for Two (September 1931)

novel: The Amateur Murderer [parts:1-4] (April, May, June, July 1932) 
[*book - 1933]

Merger with Death (December 1932)

The Death Drop (May 1933)

If Death Is Respectable (July 1933)

Murder in the Open (October 1933)

novel: Six Have Died (May 1934); Flaming Death (June 1934); Murder Book (August 1934) [aka: Murder from the East *book - 1935] Race Williams (& Flame)

The Eyes Have It (November 1934) (last Black Mask story)

The next five appeared in Dime Detective magazine.

Some Die Hard (September 1935)

Dead Hands Reaching (November 1935)(start of the “Morse” story arc)

Corpse & Co. (February 1936)

Just Another Stiff (April 1936)(end of the “Morse” story arc)

City of Blood (October 1936)

The five stories above were collected in ‘The Adventures of Race Williams’

The Morgue's Our Home (December 1936) Dime Detective

Monogram in Lead (February 1937) Dime Detective
Available from
http://davycrockettsalmanack.blogspot.com/2013/01/forgotten-and-free-stories-race.html

Dead Men Don't Kill (August 1937) Dime Detective

Anyone's Corpse! (October 1937) Dime Detective
Available from
http://davycrockettsalmanack.blogspot.com/search/label/Race%20Williams%20stories

The $1,000,000 Corpse (December 1937) Race Williams-?* (+ see [different-?*]: March 1950) Dime Detective

The Book of the Dead (January 1938) Dime Detective

A Corpse on the House (March 1938) Dime Detective

A Corpse for a Corpse (July 1938) Dime Detective
Available from
http://davycrockettsalmanack.blogspot.com/search/label/Race%20Williams%20stories

The Men in Black (October 1938) Dime Detective
Available from vintagelibrary.com

The Quick and the Dead (December 1938) Dime Detective

Hell with the Lid Lifted (March 1939) Race Williams (& Flame) Dime Detective
Available from
http://davycrockettsalmanack.blogspot.com/search/label/Race%20Williams%20stories

A Corpse in the Hand (June 1939) Dime Detective
Available from
http://davycrockettsalmanack.blogspot.com/search/label/Race%20Williams%20stories

Gangman's Gallows (August 1939) Dime Detective

The White-Headed Corpse (November 1939) Dime Detective
Available from vintagelibrary.com

Cash for a Killer (February 1940) Detective Tales Race Williams-?*

Victim for Vengeance (September 1940) Clues (Street & Smith’s)
Available at
http://davycrockettsalmanack.blogspot.com/search/label/Race%20Williams%20stories

novel: Better Corpses (1940) Race Williams (& Flame) UK only. The three stories of the “Morse” story arc:‘Dead Hands Reaching’, ‘Corpse & Co.’, and ‘Just Another Stiff’ from 1935-36. Available from vintagelibrary.com

Too Dead to Pay (March 1941) Clues (Street & Smith)
Available at
http://davycrockettsalmanack.blogspot.com/search/label/Race%20Williams%20stories

Body, Body – Who's Got the Body? (October 1944) Detective Story Magazine (Street & Smith) Race Williams-?* 
Available at
http://davycrockettsalmanack.blogspot.com/search/label/Race%20Williams%20stories

A Corpse Loses Its Head (March 1945) Race Williams-?*  Detective Story Magazine (Street & Smith)

Unremembered Murder (March 1947) Detective Story Magazine (Street & Smith) May have been later re-titled ‘Not My Corpse’

This Corpse on Me (June 1947) Thrilling Detective
Included in ‘Race Williams’ Double Date’ story collection

I'll Feel Better When You're Dead (December 1947) Thrilling Detective
Included in ‘Race Williams’ Double Date’ story collection

Not My Corpse (June 1948) Thrilling Detective - UK edition
May have been earlier titled ‘Unremembered Murder’
Available in ‘The Mammoth Book of Private Eye Stories’

Race Williams' Double Date (August 1948) Dime Detective
Included in ‘Race Williams’ Double Date’ story collection

The Wrong Corpse (February 1949) Thrilling Detective
Available from
http://davycrockettsalmanack.blogspot.com/search/label/Race%20Williams%20stories

Half a Corpse (May 1949) Dime Detective

Race Williams Cooks a Goose (October 1949) Dime Detective

The $100,000 Corpse (March 1950) Popular Detective 
(see [different-?*]: December 1937)

The Strange Case of Alta May (April 1950) Thrilling Detective

Little Miss Murder (June 1952) Smashing Detective Stories

This Corpse Is Free! (September 1952) Smashing Detective Stories
Included in ‘Race Williams’ Double Date’ story collection

Gas (June 1953) Smashing Detective Stories
Included in ‘Race Williams’ Double Date’ story collection

Head over Homicide (May 1955) [wrong title (misspelling): Head over Heels] Smashing Detective Stories

References

Other resources
Daly, Carroll John (1947). "The Ambulating Lady" [essay on his writing style]. Writer's Digest April 1947. Repr. Clues: A Journal of Detection 2.2 (1981): 113-15.

External links
Carroll John Daly bibliography at HARD-BOILED site (Comprehensive Bibliographies by Vladimir)

American crime fiction writers
1889 births
1958 deaths
American male novelists
20th-century American novelists
20th-century American male writers